Stade Municipal is a multi-use stadium in Lavié, Togo.  It is currently used mostly for football matches and is the home stadium of Kotoko F.C.  The stadium holds 5,000 people.

Municipal